David Whitmer (January 7, 1805 – January 25, 1888) was a leader in the Church of Jesus Christ of Latter Day Saints who eventually became the most interviewed of the Three Witnesses to the Book of Mormon's golden plates.

Early life
Whitmer was born near Harrisburg, Pennsylvania, on January 7, 1805, the fourth of nine children of Peter Whitmer Sr. and Mary Musselman. Whitmer's ancestry on both sides of his family was German, and the family spoke with a German accent. His grandfather was George Witmer, who was born in Prussia, and his great-grandfather was born in Switzerland. Whitmer had five brothers and three sisters, one of which died in 1813 in her infancy. He grew up attending a Presbyterian church. By the 1820s, the Whitmer family had moved to a farm in Fayette, in New York's Finger Lakes area. On March 12, 1825, Whitmer was elected sergeant in a newly organized militia called the Seneca Grenadiers.

Role in the early Latter Day Saint movement
Whitmer and his family were among the earliest adherents to the Latter Day Saint movement. Whitmer first heard of Mormonism and the golden plates in 1828 when he made a business trip to Palmyra, New York, and talked with his friend Oliver Cowdery, who believed that there "must be some truth to the matter". Whitmer was the first in his family to come into contact with the Book of Mormon. Cowdery continued to write Whitmer letters concerning the matter, which Whitmer then shared with his parents and siblings. One of Cowdery's letters inquired as to whether the Whitmers would be willing to provide the Smiths with lodging and a place to complete the translation of the Book of Mormon. The family agreed, and Joseph Smith, his wife, Emma Smith, and Cowdery came to the Whitmer farm to live on June 1, 1829. The translation was completed about a month later.

Book of Mormon witness

Whitmer was baptized in June 1829, nearly a year prior to the formal organization of the Church of Christ. During that same month, Whitmer said that he, along with Smith and Cowdery, saw an angel present the golden plates in a vision. Martin Harris reported that he experienced a similar vision with Smith later in the day. Evidence places this event near Whitmer's father's home in Fayette, New York, on June 28, 1829. Later, in an 1878 testimony, Whitmer claimed to have seen a light, "not like the light of the sun, nor like that of a fire, but more glorious and beautiful". He then went on to describe a table appearing with the golden plates, the Urim and Thummim, and other objects referenced in the Book of Mormon narrative. Whitmer continued: "I heard the voice of the Lord, as distinctly as I ever heard anything in my life, declaring that the records of the plates of the Book of Mormon were translated by the gift and power of God." Whitmer, Cowdery, and Harris signed a joint statement declaring their testimony to the reality of the vision. The statement was published in the first edition of the Book of Mormon and has been included in nearly every subsequent edition.

Whitmer later said that Smith had received a revelation that Hiram Page and Cowdery would sell the copyright of the Book of Mormon in Toronto. After Page and Cowdery returned from Canada empty handed, Whitmer asked Smith why they had been unsuccessful, and Smith received another revelation "through the stone" that "some revelations are of God: some revelations are of men: and some revelations are of the devil."

Founding church member
When Smith organized the Church of Christ on April 6, 1830, Whitmer was one of six original members. (In his 1838 history, Smith said the church was organized at the home of Whitmer's father, Peter Whitmer Sr., in Fayette, New York, but in an 1842 letter, Smith said that the church was organized at Manchester, New York.) In 1835, Whitmer assisted Cowdery and Harris in selecting and ordaining the first Quorum of the Twelve Apostles of the church. He also participated in some of the earliest LDS missionary trips, accompanying Joseph Smith and baptizing new converts.

Church offices
Whitmer had been ordained an elder of the church by June 9, 1830, and he was ordained to the office of high priest by Cowdery on October 5, 1831. Soon after the organization of the church, Smith set apart Jackson County, Missouri, as a "gathering place" for Latter Day Saints. According to Smith, the area would be the "center place" of the City of Zion, the New Jerusalem. On July 7, 1834, Smith ordained Whitmer to be the president of the church in Missouri and his own successor, should Smith "not live to God".

By virtue of his position as President of the High Council in Zion, David Whitmer was sustained as "the president of the church in Zion," not merely as a Stake President. Since the Quorum of the Twelve and the First Quorum of the Seventy had not yet been organized, this meant that there was a short period of time—from July 3, 1834, until February 14, 1835—when the High Council in Zion stood in an administrative position next to the First Presidency. It also meant that from July 3, 1834, until December 5, 1834, at which time Oliver Cowdery was made the Associate President of the Church, David Whitmer, as President of the High Council in Zion, was the Prophet's rightful successor."

Although a revelation dated June 1829 referred to Whitmer and Cowdery as receiving the same calling as the apostle Paul, Smith had not yet started a church or created the office known today as apostle. Cowdery and Whitmer did have a visionary experience and, like Paul, were called to preach. They were also called to "search out" twelve "disciples", who later were called "apostles". None of the Three Witnesses were ordained to that apostleship.

Separation from the church

Whitmer continued to live in Kirtland, Ohio, and his counselors, W. W. Phelps and John Whitmer (Whitmer's brother) presided over the church in Missouri until the summer of 1837. After the collapse of the Kirtland Safety Society bank, Smith and his counselor Sidney Rigdon, battered by creditors, moved to Far West, Missouri, to evade arrest. The ensuing leadership struggle led to the dissolution of the presidency of the church in Missouri. Whitmer resigned and separated from the church. He was formally excommunicated from the church on the grounds of breaking the Word of Wisdom, neglecting his leadership duties, meeting with the other "Kirtland apostates", and circulating unfavorable information about Joseph Smith.

Whitmer and the other excommunicated Latter Day Saints became known as the "dissenters". Some of the dissenters owned land in Caldwell County, Missouri, which they wanted to retain. The church presidency and other members looked unfavorably upon them. Rigdon preached his "Salt Sermon", which called for their expulsion from the county. A number of Latter Day Saints formed a secret society known as the Danites, whose stated goal was removal of the dissenters. Eighty prominent Mormons signed the so-called Danite Manifesto, which warned the dissenters to "depart or a more fatal calamity shall befall you." Shortly afterward, Whitmer and his family fled to nearby Richmond, Missouri.

Whitmer, other dissenters, and Mormons loyal to Smith complained to the non-Mormons in northwestern Missouri about their forcible expulsion and the loss of their properties and began to file lawsuits to recover them. Non-Mormon residents were alarmed by this and a revelation by Smith which said:
29 Wherefore, the land of Zion shall not be obtained but by purchase or by blood, otherwise there is none inheritance for you.

30 And if by purchase, behold you are blessed;

31 And if by blood, as you are forbidden to shed blood, lo, your enemies are upon you, and ye shall be scourged from city to city, and from synagogue to synagogue, and but few shall stand to receive an inheritance.
(D&C 63:29–31)

Tensions escalated, bringing about the 1838 Mormon War, after which Governor Boggs issued the Mormon Extermination Order in October 1838, authorizing deadly force in the removal of Mormons. Consequently, most of the Latter Day Saints were expelled from Missouri by early 1839.

In response to "persecutions" from a "secret organization" formed within the church that denounced "dissenters", Whitmer used his position as one of the Three Witnesses to condemn the church: "If you believe my testimony to the Book of Mormon", wrote Whitmer, "if you believe that God spake to us three witnesses by his own voice, then I tell you that in June, 1838, God spake to me again by his own voice from the heavens and told me to 'separate myself from among the Latter Day Saints, for as they sought to do unto me, so it should be done unto them.'" Whitmer interpreted God's command to include both the Church of Jesus Christ of Latter-day Saints (LDS Church) and the Reorganized Church of Jesus Christ of Latter Day Saints, (RLDS Church, now known as the Community Of Christ): "God commanded me by his voice to stand apart from you."

Whitmer continued to live in Richmond, where he operated a livery stable and was elected mayor, a position he held from 1867 to 1868.

President of the Church of Christ (Whitmerite)

After the death of Smith in 1844, several rival leaders claimed to be Smith's successor, including Brigham Young, Sidney Rigdon, and James J. Strang. Many of Rigdon's followers became disillusioned by 1847 and some, including apostle William E. McLellin and Benjamin Winchester, remembered Whitmer's 1834 ordination to be Smith's successor. At McLellin's urging, Whitmer exercised his claim to be Smith's successor and the Church of Christ (Whitmerite) was formed in Kirtland, Ohio. However, Whitmer never joined the body of the new church and it dissolved relatively quickly.

Around this time, fellow Book of Mormon witness Oliver Cowdery began to correspond with Whitmer. After traveling from Ohio to Kanesville (Council Bluffs), Cowdery attended the Kanesville Tabernacle meeting, called to sustain Brigham Young as the new President of the Church. Cowdery bore, with conviction, his testimony of the truthfulness of everything that had happened spiritually regarding Smith and the Book of Mormon. Meeting with Young at Winter Quarters, Nebraska, he requested readmission into the church, and he was re-baptized into the church there. Cowdery then traveled to meet with Whitmer in Richmond to persuade him to move west and rejoin the Saints in Utah Territory. Cowdery, however, succumbed to tuberculosis and died March 3, 1850.

In January 1876, Whitmer resurrected the Church of Christ (Whitmerite) by ordaining his nephew, John C. Whitmer, an elder, and giving him the title "First Elder".

In 1887, Whitmer published a pamphlet entitled "An Address to All Believers in Christ", in which he affirmed his testimony of the Book of Mormon, but denounced the other branches of the Latter Day Saint movement. Whitmer died in Richmond. The Whitmerite church survived until the 1960s.

Religious views

Whitmer stated his religious views in three publications: "A Proclamation" published March 24, 1881, "An Address To Believers in the Book of Mormon" published April 1887, and "An Address to All Believers in Christ" also published April 1887.

Polygamy
I do not endorse polygamy or spiritual wifeism. It is a great evil, shocking to the moral sense, and the more so, because practiced in the name of religion. It is of man and not God, and is especially forbidden in the Book of Mormon itself.

High Priests
As to the High Priesthood, Jesus Christ himself is the last Great High Priest, this too after the order of Melchisedec, as I understand the Holy Scriptures.

Name change
I do not endorse the change of the name of the church, for as the wife takes the name of her husband so should the Church of the Lamb of God, take the name of its head, even Christ himself. It is the Church of Christ.

The most interviewed Book of Mormon witness

Because Cowdery died in 1850 at age 43 and Martin Harris died in 1875 at age 92, Whitmer was the only survivor of the Three Witnesses for 13 years. At Richmond, Missouri, he sometimes received several inquirers daily asking about his connection to the Book of Mormon, including missionaries of the LDS Church who were traveling from Utah Territory to the eastern United States and Europe. Despite his hostility toward the LDS Church, Whitmer always stood by his claim that he had actually seen the golden plates.

Some of the 71 recorded interviews he gave between 1838 and 1888 contained different details than others. Recounting the vision to Orson Pratt in 1878, Whitmer claimed to have seen not only the golden plates but the "Brass Plates, the plates containing the record of the wickedness of the people of the world ... the sword of Laban, the Directors (i.e. the ball which Lehi had) and the Interpreters. I saw them just as plain as I see this bed".

In 1880, John Murphy interviewed Whitmer and later published an account suggesting that perhaps Whitmer's experience was a "delusion or perhaps a cunning scheme". Murphy's account said that Whitmer had not been able to describe the appearance of an angel and had likened Whitmer's experience to the "impressions as the quaker [receives] when the spirit moves, or as a good Methodist in giving a happy experience." Whitmer responded by publishing "A Proclamation", reaffirming his testimony and saying,

"It having been represented by one John Murphy, of Polo, Caldwell County, Mo., that I, in a conversation with him last summer, denied my testimony as one of the three witnesses to the BOOK OF MORMON. To the end, therefore, that he may understand me now, if he did not then; and that the world may know the truth, I wish now, standing as it were, in the very sunset of life, and in the fear of God, once for all to make this public statement: That I have never at any time denied that testimony or any part thereof, which has so long since been published with that Book, as one of the three witnesses. Those who know me best, well know that I have always adhered to that testimony. And that no man may be misled or doubt my present views in regard to the same, I do again affirm the truth of all of my statements, as then made and published. He that hath an ear to hear, let him hear; it was no delusion!"

To the "Proclamation" Whitmer attached an affidavit attesting to his honesty and standing in the community. Whitmer ordered that his testimony to the Book of Mormon be placed on his tombstone.

In response to a question by Anthony Metcalf, Whitmer attempted to clarify the "spiritual" versus "natural" viewing of the plates:

In regards to my testimony to the visitation of the angel, who declared to us Three Witnesses that the Book of Mormon is true, I have this to say: Of course we were in the spirit when we had the view, for no man can behold the face of an angel, except in a spiritual view, but we were in the body also, and everything was as natural to us, as it is at any time. Martin Harris, you say, called it 'being in vision.' We read in the Scriptures, Cornelius saw, in a vision, an angel of God. Daniel saw an angel in a vision, also in other places it states they saw an angel in the spirit. A bright light enveloped us where we were, that filled at noon day, and there in a vision, or in the spirit, we saw and heard just as it is stated in my testimony in the Book of Mormon. I am now passed eighty-two years old, and I have a brother, J. J. Snyder, to do my writing for me, at my dictation. [Signed] David Whitmer.

The following table shows which interviews were cited in the following publications:

Kenneth W. Godfrey, "David Whitmer and the Shaping of Latter-day Saint History," in The Disciple As Witness: Essays on Latter-Day Saint History and Doctrine in Honor of Richard Lloyd Anderson, edited by Richard Lloyd Anderson, Stephen D. Ricks, Donald W. Parry, and Andrew H. Hedges, Provo: FARMS, 2000, pp. 223–56.
Lyndon W. Cook, David Whitmer Interviews, Grandin Book, 1991.
Dan Vogel, Early Mormon Documents, Vol. V, Signature Books, 2003.
John W. Welch and Erick B. Carlson eds., Opening the Heavens, Accounts of Divine Manifestations 1820–1844, Deseret Book, 2005. Twenty-one interviews were cited, the "x-#" refers to the document number in this volume only.
Richard Lloyd Anderson, Investigating the Book of Mormon Witnesses, Deseret Book, 1981.

Notes

References

External links

 Whitmer, David—Biography at The Joseph Smith Papers Project
Collection of photographs on the Three Witnesses, L. Tom Perry Special Collections
David Whitmer Letter, L. Tom Perry Special Collections

1805 births
1888 deaths
American Latter Day Saint leaders
American Latter Day Saints
Angelic visionaries
Apostles of the Church of Christ (Latter Day Saints)
Book of Mormon witnesses
Converts to Mormonism
Doctrine and Covenants people
Founders of new religious movements
Latter Day Saint leaders
Mayors of places in Missouri
People excommunicated by the Church of Christ (Latter Day Saints)
People from Fayette, New York
Religious leaders from New York (state)
Whitmer family
Harold B. Lee Library-related 19th century articles